The 2016–17 Rugby Europe Conference is the third-level rugby union competition below the premier Championship and Trophy competitions. It is the inaugural Conference under its new format, that will see Andorra, Croatia, Cyprus, Czech Republic, Israel, Latvia, Lithuania, Luxembourg, Malta and Sweden compete for the Conference 1 title. While Austria, Bosnia and Herzegovina, Denmark, Estonia, Finland, Hungary, Norway, Serbia, Slovenia and Turkey will compete for the Conference 2 title.

The winners of Conference 1 North and South will play an additional match, a promotion play-off to the Trophy competition for the 2017–18 season. While the bottom placed teams of Conference 1 North and South will be relegated to Conference 2 for the following season, replacing the North and South winners of Conference 2. The team with the worst record in an aggregated Conference 2 table, will be relegated to the Development league for the following season.

Conference 1

North

Table

Fixtures

South

Table

Fixtures

Conference 2

North

Table

Fixtures

South

Table

Fixtures

Due to financial problems  could not compete. All games are counted as a 25–0 victory for the opposing side

Conference 2 aggregate table

See also
 Rugby Europe International Championships
 2016–17 Rugby Europe International Championships
 Six Nations Championship

References

External links
 FIRA-AER official website

2016–17 Rugby Europe International Championships
2016-17